Scott Wilson (born 1962) is Professor in Media and Cultural Studies in the School of Humanities at Kingston University, London, and member of The London Graduate School.

Wilson completed a PhD at the University of Wales, Cardiff, in 1991.

His research interests include Cultural and Critical Theory, particularly psychoanalysis and the legacy of Georges Bataille.

Selected bibliography
 Wilson, Scott (2008) Great Satan's rage: American negativity and rap/metal in the age of supercapitalism. Manchester, U.K.: Manchester University Press. 240 p. 
 Wilson, Scott (2008) The order of joy: beyond the cultural politics of enjoyment. Albany, U.S.: State University of New York Press. 188 p. (SUNY series in psychoanalysis and culture) 
 Botting, Fred and Wilson, Scott (2001) Bataille. Basingstoke, U.K.: Palgrave. 232 p. (Transitions) 
 Botting, Fred and Wilson, Scott (2001) The Tarantinian ethics. London, U.K.: Sage. 186 p.

References

Alumni of the University of Wales
British mass media scholars
1962 births
Living people
Academics of Kingston University